St. Lawrence Health System is an upstate New York three-hospital healthcare provider that encompasses what formerly were Canton-Potsdam Hospital, E.J. Noble Hospital and Massena Memorial Hospital.

History
St. Lawrence began in 2013 as "a new two-hospital system." It subsequently expanded by adding Massena Memorial Hospital in 2019.

In 2019, as they were beginning their Massena takeover, they obtained funding for "patient-centered" training and grants "providing low-income St. Lawrence County residents free rides to non-medical destinations like pharmacies, grocery stores, farmer’s markets, self-help classes and other places that could improve their health."

Their special services programs include inpatient detox/rehab and Center for Cancer Care.

References

  

Hospitals in New York (state)